Overtime is an album by the Dave Holland Big Band that won the Grammy Award for Best Large Jazz Ensemble Album in 2005. Recorded in 2002, the music centers on the four-movement "Monterey Suite", a piece commissioned by the Monterey Jazz Festival. The big band on this record is on the “small” side, at thirteen players. The rhythm section consists of Holland with vibraphonist Steve Nelson and drummer Billy Kilson (the last Holland project on which he would appear), continuing the format established over many of Holland’s Quintet records. This is the first album to appear on Holland's own Dare2 label. Featured players include tenor saxophonist Chris Potter, alto saxophonist Antonio Hart, trumpeter Alex Sipiagin and trombonist Robin Eubanks.

Reception
The Allmusic review by Thom Jurek awarded the album 4 stars, stating, "This is an essential Holland date, it is exciting, colorful and wildly innovative", and the critic of The Guardian called it, "contemporary jazz big band playing at its very best."

Russ Musto of All About Jazz wrote "Overtime, the second release from the Dave Holland Big Band, is another impressive work by the Grammy-winning large ensemble. Assembled around the legendary bassist's working quintet, the thirteen-piece unit explores the greater harmonic implications of the leader's creative compositions, without sacrificing the special rhythmic character the smaller group possesses. Built from the bottom up upon the rock solid foundation of Holland's great big bass sound with Billy Kilson's atypical drumming and Steve Nelson's vibraphone and marimba (in lieu of piano) contributing greatly to its unique sound, the aggregation has a distinctive quality that is simultaneously classic and cutting edge."

Track listing
All compositions by Dave Holland except where indicated.

 "Monterey Suite I - Bring It On" – 11:58
 "Monterey Suite II - Free for All" – 17:37
 "Monterey Suite III - A Time Remembered" – 11:45
 "Monterey Suite IV - Happy Jammy" – 9:36
 "Ario" – 11:08
 "Mental Images" (Robin Eubanks) – 9:22
 "Last Minute Man" – 7:13

Personnel
 Dave Holland –  double bass, arranger, producer
 Antonio Hart – flute, alto saxophone, soprano saxophone
 Mark Gross – alto saxophone
 Chris Potter – tenor saxophone
 Gary Smulyan – baritone saxophone
 Alex Sipiagin – flugelhorn, trumpet
 Taylor Haskins – flugelhorn, trumpet
 Duane Eubanks – flugelhorn, trumpet
 Robin Eubanks – trombone
 Jonathan Arons – trombone
 Josh Roseman – trombone
 Steve Nelson – vibraphone, marimba
 Billy Kilson – drums
 Louise Holland – producer
 James Farber – engineer
 Brian Montgomery – assistant engineer
 Greg Calbi – mastering
 [Cookie Vera] - Electric Bass

References

External links

Dave Holland albums
2005 albums
Grammy Award for Best Large Jazz Ensemble Album
Sunnyside Records albums